This is a list of governors-general of colonial Brazil (Portuguese: governadores-gerais). The office was created by D. João III in 1549. From 1640 onward, some governors-general held the title of viceroy (Portuguese: vice-rei). The office was the same, only the title was different in order to correspond to the dignity of the individual appointed to the office. From 1720, however, until the arrival of D. João VI, king of Portugal, in Rio de Janeiro, in 1808, all governors-general were viceroys.

List

See also 
 Governorate General of Brazil

More lists of office-holders of Brazil 
 List of monarchs of Brazil
 List of presidents of Brazil

References 

Colonial Brazil
Portuguese colonization of the Americas
Governors-general
Lists of political office-holders in Brazil